Diogo Antunes de Oliveira (born October 20, 1986 in Arapongas, Paraná) is a Brazilian defensive midfielder who currently plays for União Cacoalense.

Honours
Campeonato Catarinense: 2006
Campeonato Brasileiro Série A: 2010

Contract
Londrina 1 September 2006 to 31 August 2011

External links
 zerozero.pt
 Guardian Stats Centre

1986 births
Living people
Brazilian footballers
Brazilian expatriate footballers
Club Athletico Paranaense players
Londrina Esporte Clube players
Figueirense FC players
Grêmio Foot-Ball Porto Alegrense players
Fluminense FC players
Sport Club do Recife players
Vegalta Sendai players
Esporte Clube Internacional de Lages players
Operário Ferroviário Esporte Clube players
Clube Atlético Juventus players
Clube Atlético Linense players
São Carlos Futebol Clube players
União Recreativa dos Trabalhadores players
Moto Club de São Luís players
Esporte Clube Novo Hamburgo players
Sociedade Imperatriz de Desportos players
Villa Nova Atlético Clube players
Campeonato Brasileiro Série A players
Campeonato Brasileiro Série C players
Campeonato Brasileiro Série D players
J1 League players
Brazilian expatriate sportspeople in Japan
Expatriate footballers in Japan
Association football midfielders